The 2022–23 South-West Indian Ocean cyclone season is an ongoing event of the annual cycle of tropical cyclone and subtropical cyclone formation. It began on 15 November 2022, and will end on 30 April 2023, with the exception for Mauritius and the Seychelles, for which it will end on 15 May 2023. These dates conventionally delimit the period of each year when most tropical and subtropical cyclones form in the basin, which is west of 90°E and south of the Equator. However, tropical cyclones can form year-round, and all tropical cyclones that will form between 1 July 2022 and 30 June 2023 will be part of the season. Tropical and subtropical cyclones in this basin are monitored by the Regional Specialised Meteorological Centre in Réunion and unofficially by the Joint Typhoon Warning Center.



Seasonal forecasts

In October 2022, Météo-France issued its seasonal forecast of cyclone activity for the basin. The MFR predicted a season that was slightly below average to average, citing the effects of a La Niña event. The MFR placed chances of a below-average season at 60%. Average cyclone activity was given a 30% chance, and an above-average level of activity was given a 10% chance. The season in the South-West Indian Ocean was expected to be above average, with 6-10 tropical cyclones or moderate tropical storm. 

The Mauritius Meteorological Services (MMS) released their summer 2022–23 outlooks. An average season, with around eleven to nine cyclones forming, was expected. The MMS also indicates that the eastern part of the basin is more conducive to cyclone formation in the second half of summer, and the western part of the basin will also become favorable for storm formation during the second half.

Seasonal summary

The season began early, with a weak tropical low being produced on 22 September. Improving conditions over the next three days allowed the development of the system, which strengthened into Moderate Tropical Storm Ashley on 27 September. The system slowly moved westward and weakened into a remnant low on 30 September. Pre-season activity continued, with a disturbance being produced as a result of a westerly wind burst. Another storm formed on 6 October, and was named Balita on 8 October. In November 2022, Tropical Low 02U (reclassified the system as Tropical Depression 03) entered the basin and degenerated into a remnant low by the next day. In December, Severe Tropical Cyclone Darian (classified as a very intense tropical cyclone) entered the basin, before gradually weakening. In January, a new disturbance became a tropical depression and was later named Cheneso. The cyclone strengthened to severe tropical storm status before making landfall over Madagascar on 19 January. It re-intensified to Tropical Cyclone Cheneso after moving southwestwards as a overland depression (according to MFR). It was last noted as a subtropical depression on 29 January. Tropical Low 11U from the Australian region moved into this basin, where it was classified as Moderate Tropical Storm Dingani. The JTWC classified it as Tropical Cyclone 13S. Although initially struggling to intensify due to wind shear, it gradually intensified and eventually reached Tropical Cyclone status by the MFR. The JTWC upgraded it to a Category 1 tropical cyclone, before moving southwestwards and dissipated. Severe Tropical Cyclone Freddy exited the Australian region and entered this basin, where it was instantly classified as a tropical cyclone by MFR. It was later intensified into a very intense tropical cyclone. Later Cyclone Freddy further strengthened into a Category 5-equivalent tropical cyclone (according to JTWC) before making landfall over Madagascar on 21 February. It weakened as it crossed over into the Mozambique Channel, however it re-intensified to severe tropical storm status and made landfall in Mozambique on February 23. Unexpectedly, it re-emerged into the Mozambique Channel again on March 2. It reached Tropical Cyclone and Category 3 status on the MFR and SSHWS scales, respectively. It weakened, however began re-strengthening as it began its approach on Mozambique as it headed northwestward on March 10. By this time, Freddy had officially become the longest-lived tropical cyclone on record, worldwide.

Systems

Moderate Tropical Storm Ashley

On 22 September, a near-equatorial trough produced a weak tropical low in the Indian Ocean, initially expected by MFR to not form due to upper wind shear. Environmental conditions improved over the next 3 days, and the low organized enough to become the first tropical depression of the season by 26 September. Early the next day, the JTWC subsequently designated the storm as Tropical Cyclone 02S, citing a scatterometer pass indicating tropical storm-force winds in its western and eastern semicircles. The MFR also upgraded the system into a moderate tropical storm, and the Mauritius Meteorological Services (MMS) named it Ashley. The system then reached peak intensity, with 10-minute sustained winds of 75 km/h (45 mph), before succumbing to strong northeasterly shear and significant dry air intrusions late on the same day, prompting the JTWC to issue their final advisory on Ashley. The MFR terminated advisories by 06:00 UTC on 28 September as Ashley weakened into a remnant low, but continued to track the storm until it was last noted on 30 September as a dissipating low.

Moderate Tropical Storm Balita

On 2 October, the MFR began to monitor a disturbance associated with the convergence of the westerly wind burst. However, convective activity was located in the low-level convergences. Later the next day, the JTWC began monitoring an area of convection. Satellite images indicated that the low-level cloud lines wrapping into the low-level center. Early on 5 October, the JTWC issued a Tropical Cyclone Formation Alert on the system. The JTWC subsequently initiated advisories on the system and classified it as Tropical Cyclone 03S at 03:00 UTC on 6 October. By 06:00 UTC, the MFR upgraded it to a tropical depression. An ASCAT pass featured below gale-force winds on its southern quadrant. Despite moderate northeasterly wind shear, convection increased around the system. 

The MFR further upgraded it to a moderate tropical storm at 00:00 UTC on 8 October with the name Balita from the MMS. Microwave imagery revealed that Balita had improved its convective structure. At 06:00 UTC on October 9, Balita's structure became elongated and asymmetrical, prompting MFR to reclassify the storm as a post-tropical depression. Later that same day, the MFR ceased advisories, and the JTWC followed suit. The remnants fully dissipated on 13 October.

Tropical Depression 03

On 5 November, Tropical Low 02U that was being monitored by the MFR crossed into the South-West Indian Ocean basin from the Australian region. At the time, there was no more convection associated, only a low-level vortex. Thunderstorm activity has resumed in the southern part of the system in the last few hours. Upon entering the basin, the JTWC ceased advisories by 09:00 UTC that day. The MFR's reclassified the system as Tropical Depression 03. Environmental conditions were assessed as being marginally conducive for tropical cyclogenesis, with low vertical wind shear and moderate equatorial outflow. At 06:00 UTC on 6 November, the MFR's issued their last warning as the system degenerated into a remnant low.

Very Intense Tropical Cyclone Darian 

On 21 December, Severe Tropical Cyclone Darian moved into the basin from the Australian region, and was immediately classified as a very intense tropical cyclone by MFR. Darian exhibited a highly symmetrical cloud structure around a well-defined eye. Shortly afterward, Darian's cloud pattern deteriorated and its eye started to become less defined, causing the cyclone to weaken to an intense tropical cyclone by 18:00 UTC. Darian weakened to a Category 3-equivalent cyclone the next day, as the convective cloud tops had warmed slightly. Darian's then weakened due to strong wind shear, and was downgraded into a tropical cyclone. With a well-defined eye and impressive appearance on satellite imagery, Darian re-intensified, reaching 10-minute maximum sustained winds of  around 06:00 UTC on 23 December. The cyclone was highly compact, with a distinct eye surrounded by cold cloud tops. Darian became quasi-stationary due to the presence of two main flows. Steady weakening occurred thereafter as it underwent an eyewall replacement cycle. 

Multispectral animated satellite imagery revealed a  surrounded eye around deep convection as a result, the cyclone weakened to Category 2-equivalent cyclone. Due to moderate east-northeasterly vertical wind shear, Darian fell to  winds, according to MFR. Just six hours later, the eye feature persisted, consisting of a warm area within the cooling eyewall. At 15:00 UTC on 27 December, the JTWC further downgraded it to a Category 1-equivalent cyclone. Satellite imagery showed that the cloud pattern began to rapidly deteriorate, and MFR followed suit and declared it a severe tropical storm. The JTWC also reported that Darian's weakened into a tropical storm. By 00:00 UTC on 29 December, Darian weakened into a moderate tropical storm, after the convection diminished around the center. MFR issued its last advisory on the storm on 30 December as it transitioned into a post-tropical depression. The JTWC also discontinued warnings on the system around 03:00 UTC on 31 December.

Tropical Cyclone Cheneso 

Cheneso formed on 16 January to the south of Diego Garcia. The system meandered southwestward, becoming a tropical disturbance on 18 January. By late the next day, the system had intensified into Moderate Tropical Storm Cheneso, and the JTWC classified it as Tropical Cyclone 08S. Satellite imagery showed that a central dense overcast (CDO) was obscuring the low-level circulation center (LLCC), and Cheneso intensified further into a severe tropical storm. The cyclone moved ashore in northern Madagascar on 17 January and quickly weakened as it crossed the country. It emerged into the Mozambique Channel as a weak tropical disturbance. Cheneso again reached open waters, and briefly re-intensified into a tropical cyclone. By 06:00 UTC on 29 January, Cheneso structure became poorly organized, prompting MFR to reclassify the storm as a post-tropical depression. The JTWC discontinued warnings on the system around 03:00 UTC on 30 January.  

Authorities issued an alert of heavy rain in the country, posing an imminent risk of flooding and landslides. The National Bureau of Risk and Disaster Management (BNGRC) reported 90,870 affected people, and 34,100 were displaced. Overall, the cyclone was responsible for 33 deaths and 20 others missing.

Tropical Cyclone Dingani 

On 9 February, Tropical Low 11U from the Australian region entered the basin and was designated as Moderate Tropical Storm Dingani. By 03:00 UTC, the JTWC issued a TCFA, after noting persistent deep convection within its southern quadrant. Later that day, the JTWC initiated advisories on the system and classified it as Tropical Cyclone 13S. The storm had a broad and fully exposed LCC, but was struggling due to northeasterly vertical windshear. By 00:00 UTC on 11 February, as convection maintained near the center, the MFR upgraded the system to a severe tropical storm. Later the next day, Dingani had rapidly consolidated as it formed a  diameter eye, including a significant improved convective structure; the JTWC's assessed the storm to have strengthened into  of winds. Dingani continued to intensify and soon became a tropical cyclone. Twelve hours later, the cyclone maintained a well defined-eye. However, shear began impacting the storm, causing the eye to dissappear. By 00:00 UTC on 14 February, Dingani weakened back into a severe tropical storm. The JTWC also reported that Dingani's weakened into a tropical storm. Later the next day, Dingani later transitioned into a post-tropical depression. The system was poorly organized, with a high wind shear environment, and the JTWC issued a final warning on the system on 16 February.

Very Intense Tropical Cyclone Freddy 

On 14 February, Severe Tropical Cyclone Freddy moved into the basin from the Australian region and was classified as a tropical cyclone. The agency later upgraded the system to a intense tropical cyclone. Freddy's structure began to improve as a eye feature was becoming visible in a small central dense overcast. Freddy then began to exhibit some annular characteristics, before re-intensifying and reaching 1-minute maximum sustained winds of  around 03:00 UTC on 15 February. The JTWC noted that Freddy had a small symmetric  eye. During 19 February, the storm weakened slightly then intensified once again and was reclassified as a very intense tropical cyclone by the MFR. By 00:00 UTC on 20 February, Freddy's cloud pattern slightly deteriorated, causing the cyclone to weaken to an intense tropical cyclone. During the next day, Freddy made its first landfall Mananjary, Madagascar. Freddy had degenerated into an overland depression. Freddy substantially weakened as it traversed the mountainous terrain of Madagascar. Freddy rapidly weakened overland, but re-attained severe tropical storm on 23 February after moving over the Mozambique Channel. Soon afterward, Freddy made second landfall south of Vilankulos, Mozambique. Freddy re-emerged into the Mozambique Channel, the MFR resumed advisories on the system as tropical disturbance on 2 March. 

Satellite imagery showed that an ill-defined eye was visible, and Freddy intensified further into a tropical cyclone. Freddy rapidly weakened as a result of the presence of higher wind shear as well as dry air intrusion. The JTWC and MFR indicated that Freddy strengthened into . Freddy made its third landfall on Quelimane, Zambezia Province, Mozambique. Freddy gradually degraded and MFR ceased monitoring it as an overland depression on 13 March. Once inland, Freddy rapidly weakened, and dissipated on 15 March. In anticipation of Freddy, the MFR issued a cyclone yellow pre-alert for the island of Réunion. Freddy impacted Réunion with its effects being relatively limited. At least 20,000 people were displaced in Malawi. President of Malawi, Lazarus Chakwera, declared a state of disaster in the southern regions. So far, 543 people have died and 282 others are still missing in the onslaught of Freddy.

Tropical Cyclone Enala

On 18 February, the MFR began monitoring a clockwise circulation located in the far northeastern corner of the basin, west-northwest of Cocos Islands. On the following day it was classified as a zone of disturbed weather by the MFR. Convection had accelerated and was near to the circulation's center. During 22 February, the system began to show signs of organization, and the system gained sufficient organization, noted by curved cloud bands, to be classified as a tropical depression. Later that day, the JTWC issued a TCFA on the system. By 09:00 UTC that day, the JTWC initiated advisories on the system and classified it as Tropical Cyclone 14S. The MFR further upgraded it to a moderate tropical storm with the name Enala from the MMS. Enala's cloud pattern slightly changed in the southwestern semicircle of the system. Enala strengthened into a Category 1-equivalent tropical cyclone on 23 February. MFR also upgraded the system into a severe tropical storm. The cyclone began to show an eye that was visible on satellite imagery. Enala intensified into tropical cyclone at 00:00 UTC on 24 February. Later that next day, the JTWC also reported that Enala's weakened into a tropical storm. During 28 February, while continuing to weaken, both the MFR and JTWC ceased issuing advisories due to it initiating subtropical transition.

Storm names
Within the South-West Indian Ocean, tropical depressions and subtropical depressions that are judged to have 10-minute sustained windspeeds of 65 km/h (40 mph) by the Regional Specialized Meteorological Center on Réunion island, France (RSMC La Réunion) are usually assigned a name. However, it is the Sub-Regional Tropical Cyclone Advisory Centers in Mauritius and Madagascar who name the systems. The Sub-Regional Tropical Cyclone Advisory Center (Mauritius Meteorological Services) in Mauritius names a storm if it intensifies into a moderate tropical storm between 55°E and 90°E. If instead a cyclone intensifies into a moderate tropical storm between 30°E and 55°E then the Sub-Regional Tropical Cyclone Advisory Center (Meteo Madagascar) in Madagascar assigns the appropriate name to the storm. Storm names are taken from three pre-determined lists of names, which rotate on a triennial basis, with any names that have been used automatically removed. Therefore, all storm names used this year will be removed from the rotation and replaced with a new name for the 2025–26 season, while the unused names will remain on the list.New names this season are: Ashley, Balita, Cheneso, Dingani, Enala, Fabien, Gezani, Horacio, Indusa and Juluka. They replaced Ambali, Belna, Calvinia, Diane, Esami, Francisco, Gabekile, Herold, Irondro and Jeruto during the 2019–20 season. The name Enala was mispelled by Météo-France (MFR).

If a tropical cyclone enters the South-West Indian basin from the Australian region basin (west of 90°E), it will retain the name assigned to it by the Australian Bureau of Meteorology (BoM). The following storms were named in this manner.
Darian
Freddy

Season effects
This table lists all of the tropical cyclones and subtropical cyclones that were monitored during the 2022–2023 South-West Indian Ocean cyclone season. Information on their intensity, duration, name, areas affected, primarily comes from RSMC La Réunion. Death and damage reports come from either press reports or the relevant national disaster management agency while the damage totals are given in 2022 or 2023 USD.

|-
|  ||  || bgcolor=#| || bgcolor=#| || bgcolor=#| || None || ||  ||
|-
|  ||  || bgcolor=#| || bgcolor=#| || bgcolor=#| || None || ||  ||
|-
|  ||  || bgcolor=#| || bgcolor=#| || bgcolor=#| || None || ||  ||
|-
|  ||  || bgcolor=#| || bgcolor=#| || bgcolor=#| || None || ||  ||
|-
|  ||  || bgcolor=#| || bgcolor=#| || bgcolor=#| || Madagascar || ||   || 
|-
|  ||  || bgcolor=#| || bgcolor=#| || bgcolor=#| || None || ||  || 
|-
|  ||  || bgcolor=#| || bgcolor=#| || bgcolor=#| || Mascarene Islands, Madagascar, Mozambique, Zimbabwe, Malawi || ||  || 
|-
|  ||  || bgcolor=#| || bgcolor=#| || bgcolor=#| || None ||  ||  || 
|-

See also

Weather of 2022 and 2023
List of Southern Hemisphere cyclone seasons
Tropical cyclones in 2022 and 2023
Atlantic hurricane seasons: 2022, 2023
Pacific hurricane seasons: 2022, 2023
Pacific typhoon seasons: 2022, 2023
North Indian Ocean cyclone seasons: 2022, 2023
2022–23 Australian region cyclone season
2022–23 South Pacific cyclone season

References

External links

 Météo-France La Réunion 
 Alternative website
 Direction Générale de la Météorologie de Madagascar 
 Mauritius Meteorological Services
 Joint Typhoon Warning Center (JTWC)

2022-23